is a former Japanese football player. He played for Japan national team.

Club career
Shimokawa was born in Gifu on May 14, 1970. After graduating from high school, he joined Furukawa Electric (later JEF United Ichihara) in 1989. From first season, he played as regular goalkeeper over 10 seasons. In 2000, his opportunity to play decreased behind Ryo Kushino. He moved to Yokohama F. Marinos in 2001. However, there were few opportunities to play in the match. His only match in the J1 League at Yokohama F. Marinos is last game in 2003 season. In this match, he played instead Tetsuya Enomoto was shown a red card in the 15th minute. Marinos won this match and won the J1 League champions in this season. He retired end of 2006 season.

National team career
On June 10, 1995, Shimokawa debuted for Japan national team against Sweden. He played in all match at 1996 Asian Cup. He played 9 games for Japan until 1997.

Club statistics

National team statistics

 1996 Asian Cup

References

External links
 
 Japan National Football Team Database
 

1970 births
Living people
Association football people from Gifu Prefecture
Japanese footballers
Japan Soccer League players
J1 League players
JEF United Chiba players
Yokohama F. Marinos players
Japan international footballers
1996 AFC Asian Cup players
Footballers at the 1990 Asian Games
Association football goalkeepers
Asian Games competitors for Japan
Footballers at the 1994 Asian Games